In category theory, a Kleisli category is a category naturally associated to any monad T. It is equivalent to the category of free T-algebras. The Kleisli category is one of two extremal solutions to the question Does every monad arise from an adjunction? The other extremal solution is the Eilenberg–Moore category. Kleisli categories are named for the mathematician Heinrich Kleisli.

Formal definition

Let 〈T, η, μ〉 be a monad over a category C. The Kleisli category of C is the category CT whose objects and morphisms are given by

That is, every morphism f: X → T Y in C (with codomain TY) can also be regarded as a morphism in CT (but with codomain Y). Composition of morphisms in CT is given by

where f: X → T Y and g: Y → T Z. The identity morphism is given by the monad unit η:
.

An alternative way of writing this, which clarifies the category in which each object lives, is used by Mac Lane.  We use very slightly different notation for this presentation.  Given the same monad and category  as above, we associate with each object  in  a new object , and for each morphism  in  a morphism .  Together, these objects and morphisms form our category , where we define

Extension operators and Kleisli triples

Composition of Kleisli arrows can be expressed succinctly by means of the extension operator (–)# : Hom(X, TY) → Hom(TX, TY). Given a monad 〈T, η, μ〉 over a category C and a morphism f : X → TY let

Composition in the Kleisli category CT can then be written

The extension operator satisfies the identities:

where f : X → TY and g : Y → TZ. It follows trivially from these properties that Kleisli composition is associative and that ηX is the identity.

In fact, to give a monad is to give a Kleisli triple 〈T, η, (–)#〉, i.e. 
 A function ;
such that the above three equations for extension operators are satisfied.

Kleisli adjunction

Kleisli categories were originally defined in order to show that every monad arises from an adjunction. That construction is as follows.

Let 〈T, η, μ〉 be a monad over a category C and let CT be the associated Kleisli category. Using Mac Lane's notation mentioned in the “Formal definition” section above, define a functor F: C → CT by

and a functor G : CT → C by

One can show that F and G are indeed functors and that F is left adjoint to G. The counit of the adjunction is given by

Finally, one can show that T = GF and μ = GεF so that 〈T, η, μ〉 is the monad associated to the adjunction 〈F, G, η, ε〉.

Showing that GF = T
For any object X in category C:
 

For any  in category C:
 
Q.E.D.

References

External links
 

Adjoint functors
Categories in category theory